Shorea hopeifolia (called, along with some other species in the genus Shorea, yellow meranti) is a species of plant in the family Dipterocarpaceae. It is a tree found in Sumatra, Peninsular Malaysia, Borneo and the Philippines.

References

hopeifolia
Trees of Sumatra
Trees of Peninsular Malaysia
Trees of Borneo
Trees of the Philippines
Critically endangered flora of Asia
Taxonomy articles created by Polbot